God's Bridge  is a Site of Special Scientific Interest in the County Durham district of south-west County Durham, England. It is a natural limestone bridge over the River Greta, just over 3 km upstream from the village of Bowes. 

The bridge was formed by a process of cave development in the limestone beneath the river bed and is the best example in Britain of a natural bridge formed in this way. The SSSI covers a portion of the river above and below the bridge where shallow cave development by solutional activity is still taking place.

The Pennine Way crosses the River Greta at God's Bridge.

Yorkshire Dales

A similar formation on the River Doe near Chapel-le-Dale in the Yorkshire Dales has the same name.

References

Sites of Special Scientific Interest in County Durham
Natural arches of England
Bowes